Diarmuid mac Sheáin Bhuí Mac Cárthaigh, Irish poet, died 1705.

Mac Cárthaigh was a Jacobite poet, and a native of County Cork.

See also

 Dónall na Buile Mac Cárthaigh,  fl. 1730s–40s.
 Eoghan an Mhéirín Mac Cárthaigh, 1691–1756.
 Liam Rua Mac Coitir, 1675/90?–1738.
 Donnchadh Ruadh Mac Conmara, 1715–1810.

References

 Ireland And The Jacobite Cause, 1685–1766: A Fatal Attachment, p. 53, 78, 79, 80, 86, 141, 159, 224, Éamonn Ó Ciardha, Four Courts Press, 2001, 2004.

Irish poets
Irish-language poets
Irish Jacobites
People from County Cork
18th-century Irish people
1705 deaths